Charles David Houston (December 9, 1935 – November 30, 1993) was an American country music singer. His peak in popularity came between the mid-1960s and the early 1970s.

His biggest success came in 1966, when his recording of "Almost Persuaded", topped the Billboard's Hot Country Singles chart for nine weeks, and garnered Houston a pair of Grammy Awards.

Biography

Houston was born in Bossier City in northwestern Louisiana, United States. He was a descendant of Sam Houston, the first president of the Republic of Texas and Confederate General Robert E. Lee. His godfather was 1920s pop singer Gene Austin. Like Austin, Houston lived briefly as a youth in a house at the intersection of Marshall and Goodwill streets in Minden, the seat of Webster Parish in northwestern Louisiana. Another musician from Minden, Tommy Tomlinson, collaborated with Houston in the single "Mountain of Love".

Houston was one of the earliest artists with National Recording Corporation in Atlanta, Georgia. In 1963, he rose to national stardom with "Mountain of Love"; the song, which was different from the tune made famous by composer Harold Dorman, Johnny Rivers, and Charley Pride, rose to number two on Billboard's Hot Country Singles chart, as did "Livin' in a House Full of Love" (1965).

In 1966, Houston recorded "Almost Persuaded." This song, which is unrelated to the Philip Paul Bliss hymn of the same title, is the tale of a married man managing to resist a temptress he meets in a tavern. Houston's recording of it quickly reached number one that August, eventually spending nine weeks atop Billboard's Hot Country Singles chart. For 46 years, no song did as well until Taylor Swift matched its nine-week record on December 15, 2012, with "We Are Never Ever Getting Back Together." (Swift's song went on to surpass the nine-week run of "Almost Persuaded," spending a 10th week at No. 1 in early 2013.)

Houston was awarded two Grammy Awards for Best Country & Western Recording and Best Country & Western Performance, Male in 1967 for "Almost Persuaded".

He entertained troops at Fort Polk, Louisiana in 1968.

"Almost Persuaded" began a string of top five Houston singles through 1973, including six more number ones: "With One Exception" and "You Mean the World to Me" (1967); "Have a Little Faith" and "Already It's Heaven" (1968); "Baby, Baby (I Know You're a Lady)" (1970); and 1967's "My Elusive Dreams" duet with Tammy Wynette.

In later years, Houston sang duets with Barbara Mandrell on several of her early hits, most notably 1970's "After Closing Time" and 1972's "I Love You, I Love You".

Houston's last Top 10 country hit came in 1974 with "Can't You Feel It", though he continued making records until 1989.

Houston died of a brain aneurysm on November 30, 1993, in Bossier City, one week before his 58th birthday. He had been residing in the New Orleans suburb of Kenner.

Discography

Albums

Singles

A"Almost Persuaded" also peaked at No. 45 on the RPM Top Singles chart in Canada.

Singles from collaboration albums

Notes

Missing from David Houston's 45 Discography are "We Got Love" (1964) and "My Little Lady" (1965).

References

Bibliography
Roy, Don. (1998). "David Houston". In The Encyclopedia of Country Music. Paul Kingsbury, Editor. New York: Oxford University Press. p. 249.

External links
David Houston at Discogs
 

1935 births
1993 deaths
American country singer-songwriters
American male singer-songwriters
People from Minden, Louisiana
People from Bossier City, Louisiana
Grammy Award winners
Grand Ole Opry members
National Recording Corporation artists
RCA Victor artists
Epic Records artists
20th-century American singers
Singer-songwriters from Louisiana
Country musicians from Louisiana
Deaths from intracranial aneurysm
20th-century American male singers